Søren Hans Smith Sørensen (9 December 1885 – 31 March 1973) was a Norwegian ship-owner and politician for the Conservative Party.

Sørensen was born on the island of Tromøya in Aust-Agder, Norway.  He was the son of ship builder, O. B. Sørensen (1836-1916) who established Bratteklev skipsverft on Tromøya. He started as a ship captain in 1912. After the death of his father in 1916,  he ran the combined business of ship-ownership and shipbuilding until his own death in 1973.  In 1930, he established Smith-Sørensens Tankrederi in Arendal. He was also involved in local marine insurance.

He was a member of Tromøy municipal council during the term 1916–1919, and then served as mayor from 1919 to 1941 and in 1945. He was elected to the Norwegian Parliament from Aust-Agder in 1945, but was not re-elected in 1949.

See also
Assuranceforeningen Gard

References

External links

1885 births
1973 deaths
People from Aust-Agder
Members of the Storting
Mayors of places in Aust-Agder
Conservative Party (Norway) politicians
Norwegian businesspeople in shipping
Norwegian businesspeople in insurance
20th-century Norwegian politicians